John the Fearless is a 1984 animated Belgian film. It is notable for being the first feature-length animated film produced in Flanders in its entirety. It is based on a novel by Constant de Kinder and features voice work by Belgian character actor Jan Decleir. An English dubbed version of the film was produced by Canadian animation studio Cinar Films and was released on video in 1989 by Just For Kids Video.

Plot 
The story begins in Antwerp, Belgium, in the year 1410 when John resigns his job as a sailor and goes back home to his grandmother. After seeing all of the burglars in town, he takes it upon himself to rid the town of all evildoers. After he has become the word around town, he lets everyone in the town know that he has no fear. His cousin, in jealousy of John's newfound fame decides to disprove this statement, by showing up at the local graveyard dressed as a ghost. John, annoyed with the ghost's presence, accidentally kills his cousin. Realizing his mistake, he reports it, only to be arrested and sentenced to prison. However, he easily escapes the prison guards and goes about his ways. He ends up soon after in the countryside, to find a servant being beaten by his master. After showing the boss the error of his ways, the boss recognizes his goodheartedness and sends him on a quest to destroy a shape shifting evil water demon called Kludde, with the servant as his sidekick. John, true to his claim of having "no fear" begins his quest with good spirits. After accomplishing numerous brave deeds, he is knighted by the historical John the Fearless.

English Cast 
 Michael Rudder as John
 Rob Roy as Dokus
 Linda O'Dwyer
 Dean Hagopian
 Terrence Labrosse
 Kelly Ricard
 Mark Berman
 Walter Massey
 Bronwen Mantel
 Arthur Grosser
 Kathleen Fee
 Dave Patrick
 A. J. Henderson
 Steve Michaels
 Ian Finlay
 Jane Woods
 Liz MacRae
 Harry Hill
 Richard M. Dumont
 Gayle Garfinkle

External links
 
 John the Fearless @ Yahoo Movie
 John the Fearless @ Movie Review

Belgian animated films
Belgian children's fantasy films
Belgian historical films
1984 films
1984 animated films
1980s children's fantasy films
Films based on folklore
Animated films based on novels
Films set in the Middle Ages
Films set in the 1410s
Films set in Antwerp
1984 fantasy films
Films based on Belgian novels
DHX Media films
1980s Dutch-language films
Dutch-language Belgian films